Thomas de Grace (1584–1636) was a Roman Catholic prelate who served as Titular Bishop of Dionysias (1628–1636) and Auxiliary Bishop of Liège (1628–1636).

Biography
Thomas de Grace was born in Grace, France in 1584 and ordained a priest in the Diocese of Liège on 22 Sep 1607.
On 11 Dec 1628, he was appointed during the papacy of Pope Urban VIII as Titular Bishop of Dionysias and Auxiliary Bishop of Liège.
in 1629, he was consecrated bishop by Pier Luigi Carafa, Bishop of Tricarico.
He served as Auxiliary Bishop of Liège until his death on 4 Aug 1636.

References 

17th-century French Roman Catholic bishops
Bishops appointed by Pope Urban VIII
1584 births
1636 deaths